Darren Kennedy (born 12 January 1981) is an Irish television presenter, Entrepreneur and Creative Director from Dublin, now based between New York, Los Angeles and London. He regularly works with BBC, ITV and RTÉ. He is the creator & co-founder of men's grooming brand Kennedy & Co.

Career

Broadcasting
Kennedy began his career in Ireland as a reporter on the Gerry Ryan show 2FM and TV’s Operation Transformation on RTÉ One, and hosted celebrity entertainment series #Trending on RTÉ 2 and regularly presented on ITV 1's This Morning alongside Holly Willoughby and Phillip Schofield. He co-created and presented 'Gay Daddy', and co-presented and devised The Unemployables series with Jennifer Maguire.  Well known and respected for his aesthetic & sense of style, his home was featured in Celebrity Home of The Year on RTE One. In 2019 he was a contestant on Dancing With The Stars. In March 2020, he was announced as one of the Fab Five on BBC One's new flagship fashion makeover series You Are What You Wear with Rylan Clark. In January 2021, he took part in Celebrity Mastermind. As of January 2023, he's fronting the new 'Celebrity Closets' segment from Los Angeles, as part of ITV's Lorraine, where he interviews celebrities as they take viewers on a trip down memory lane via their iconic wardrobes.

Dancing with the Stars 
 
In 2019, Kennedy took part in the third series of Dancing with the Stars. He was partnered with Karen Byrne, they competed into the 5th week.

 Professional partner
 Karen Byrne; Average: 16.5; Place: 9th

Fashion
He designed a contemporary suiting and outerwear collection in collaboration with Irish tailor Louis Copeland which produced six sell-out collections. He is a fashion ambassador for the UK highstreet optician Specsavers. He regularly works with some of the world's most influential brands including Hugo Boss, Tommy Hilfiger and Topman. He has hosted for BAFTA, GQ, several seasons of London Fashion Week Festival for the British Fashion Council and live on the red carpet for the Brit Awards. Darren also regularly contributes to Beverly Hills Lifestyle magazine.

Entrepreneur
Kennedy's first solo venture was in his early twenties when he established a style bureau providing consultancy services to personal and corporate clients including blue chip companies Google, Tommy Hilfiger and BMW. An offshoot of this business developed into an online magazine Help My Style which at the time was one of the first of its kind in Ireland.

In November 2018, he launched Irish Made, skin and hair care brand Kennedy & Co. In 2020 the brand announced it had signed a deal to be distributed across the Middle East.

Awards
Kennedy is regularly nominated in most Stylish Man award categories. He was voted winner of Ireland's Most Stylish Man at the VIP (magazine) Style Awards in 2013. He subsequently went on to host the televised awards show for three consecutive years on TV3.

In 2016 he was nominated for the IFTA Film & Drama Awards TV Rising Star award, which recognises the skill, talent, and professionalism of Ireland's leading young broadcasters and brightest rising stars who are blazing a trail across Irish and international TV screens.

Kennedy was named Most influential Fashion Journalist in Ireland in the annual Murray Twitter Index.

References

External links

 Official site
 

1981 births
Irish expatriates in the United Kingdom
Living people
Television personalities from Dublin (city)
Television presenters from the Republic of Ireland
Irish LGBT broadcasters
21st-century LGBT people
People educated at St Aidan's C.B.S.
Alumni of Dublin Institute of Technology